In mathematics, in particular the theory of Lie algebras, the Weyl group (named after Hermann Weyl) of a root system Φ is a subgroup of the isometry group of that root system. Specifically, it is the subgroup which is generated by reflections through the hyperplanes orthogonal to the roots, and as such is a finite reflection group. In fact it turns out that most finite reflection groups are Weyl groups. Abstractly, Weyl groups are finite Coxeter groups, and are important examples of these.

The Weyl group of a semisimple Lie group, a semisimple Lie algebra, a semisimple linear algebraic group, etc. is the Weyl group of the root system of that group or algebra.

Definition and examples

Let  be a root system in a Euclidean space .
,
By the definition of a root system, each  preserves , from which it follows that  is a finite group.

In the case of the  root system, for example, the hyperplanes perpendicular to the roots are just lines, and the Weyl group is the symmetry group of an equilateral triangle, as indicated in the figure. As a group,  is isomorphic to the permutation group on three elements, which we may think of as the vertices of the triangle.

We may consider also the  root system. In this case,  is the space of all vectors in  whose entries sum to zero. The reflection associated to such a root is the transformation of  obtained by interchanging the th and th entries of each vector.

Weyl chambers

If  is a root system, we may consider the hyperplane perpendicular to each root . Recall that  denotes the reflection about the hyperplane and that the Weyl group is the group of transformations of  generated by all the 's. The complement of the set of hyperplanes is disconnected, and each connected component is called a Weyl chamber. If we have fixed a particular set Δ of simple roots, we may define the fundamental Weyl chamber associated to Δ as the set of points  such that  for all .

Since the reflections  preserve , they also preserve the set of hyperplanes perpendicular to the roots. Thus, each Weyl group element permutes the Weyl chambers.

The figure illustrates the case of the A2 root system. The "hyperplanes" (in this case, one dimensional) orthogonal to the roots are indicated by dashed lines. The six 60-degree sectors are the Weyl chambers and the shaded region is the fundamental Weyl chamber associated to the indicated base.

A basic general theorem about Weyl chambers is this:
Theorem: The Weyl group acts freely and transitively on the Weyl chambers. Thus, the order of the Weyl group is equal to the number of Weyl chambers.
A related result is this one:
Theorem: Fix a Weyl chamber .

Coxeter group structure

Generating set
A key result about the Weyl group is this:
That is to say, the group generated by the reflections  is the same as the group generated by the reflections .

Relations
Then we have the following results:
Since  and  each have order two, this is equivalent to saying that .
The preceding claim is not hard to verify, if we simply remember what the Dynkin diagram tells us about the angle between each pair of roots. More generally, the number of bonds determines the angle  between the roots.

As a Coxeter group
Weyl groups are examples of finite reflection groups, as they are generated by reflections; the abstract groups (not considered as subgroups of a linear group) are accordingly finite Coxeter groups, which allows them to be classified by their Coxeter–Dynkin diagram. Being a Coxeter group means that a Weyl group has a special kind of presentation in which each generator xi is of order two, and the relations other than xi2=1 are of the form (xixj)mij=1. The generators are the reflections given by simple roots, and mij is 2, 3, 4, or 6 depending on whether roots i and j make an angle of 90, 120, 135, or 150 degrees, i.e., whether in the Dynkin diagram they are unconnected, connected by a simple edge, connected by a double edge, or connected by a triple edge.

Weyl groups have a Bruhat order and length function in terms of this presentation: the length of a Weyl group element is the length of the shortest word representing that element in terms of these standard generators. There is a unique longest element of a Coxeter group, which is opposite to the identity in the Bruhat order.

Weyl groups in algebraic, group-theoretic, and geometric settings
Above, the Weyl group was defined as a subgroup of the isometry group of a root system.  There are also various definitions of Weyl groups specific to various group-theoretic and geometric contexts  (Lie algebra, Lie group, symmetric space, etc.).  For each of these ways of defining Weyl groups, it is a (usually nontrivial) theorem that it is a Weyl group in the sense of the definition at the top of this article, namely the Weyl group of some root system associated with the object. A concrete realization of such a Weyl group usually depends on a choice – e.g. of Cartan subalgebra for a Lie algebra, of maximal torus for a Lie group.

The Weyl group of a connected compact Lie group
.
.
.
Eventually, one proves that , at which point one has an alternative description of the Weyl group as
.

For each , one can construct an element  of  whose action on  has the form of reflection.

In other settings

For a complex semisimple Lie algebra, the Weyl group is simply defined as the reflection group generated by reflections in the roots – the specific realization of the root system depending on a choice of Cartan subalgebra.

For a Lie group G satisfying certain conditions, given a torus T < G (which need not be maximal), the Weyl group with respect to that torus is defined as the quotient of the normalizer of the torus N = N(T) = NG(T) by the centralizer of the torus Z = Z(T) = ZG(T),

The group W is finite – Z is of finite index in N. If T = T0 is a maximal torus (so it equals its own centralizer) then the resulting quotient N/Z = N/T is called the Weyl group of G, and denoted W(G). Note that the specific quotient set depends on a choice of maximal torus, but the resulting groups are all isomorphic (by an inner automorphism of G), since maximal tori are conjugate.

If G is compact and connected, and T is a maximal torus, then the Weyl group of G is isomorphic to the Weyl group of its Lie algebra, as discussed above.

For example, for the general linear group GL, a maximal torus is the subgroup D of invertible diagonal matrices, whose normalizer is the generalized permutation matrices (matrices in the form of permutation matrices, but with any non-zero numbers in place of the '1's), and whose Weyl group is the symmetric group. In this case the quotient map N → N/T splits (via the permutation matrices), so the normalizer N is a semidirect product of the torus and the Weyl group, and the Weyl group can be expressed as a subgroup of G. In general this is not always the case – the quotient does not always split, the normalizer N is not always the semidirect product of W and Z, and the Weyl group cannot always be realized as a subgroup of G.

Bruhat decomposition

If B is a Borel subgroup of G, i.e., a maximal connected solvable subgroup and a maximal torus T = T0 is chosen to lie in B, then we obtain the Bruhat decomposition

which gives rise to the decomposition of the flag variety G/B into Schubert cells (see Grassmannian).

The structure of the Hasse diagram of the group is related geometrically to the cohomology of the manifold (rather, of the real and complex forms of the group), which is constrained by Poincaré duality. Thus algebraic properties of the Weyl group correspond to general topological properties of manifolds. For instance, Poincaré duality gives a pairing between cells in dimension k and in dimension n - k (where n is the dimension of a manifold): the bottom (0) dimensional cell corresponds to the identity element of the Weyl group, and the dual top-dimensional cell corresponds to the longest element of a Coxeter group.

Analogy with algebraic groups

There are a number of analogies between algebraic groups and Weyl groups – for instance, the number of elements of the symmetric group is n!, and the number of elements of the general linear group over a finite field is related to the q-factorial ; thus the symmetric group behaves as though it were a linear group over "the field with one element". This is formalized by the field with one element, which considers Weyl groups to be simple algebraic groups over the field with one element.

Cohomology
For a non-abelian connected compact Lie group G, the first group cohomology of the Weyl group W with coefficients in the maximal torus T used to define it, is related to the outer automorphism group of the normalizer  as:

The 0th and 2nd group cohomology are also closely related to the normalizer.

See also
Affine Weyl group
Semisimple Lie algebra#Cartan subalgebras and root systems
Maximal torus
Root system of a semi-simple Lie algebra
Hasse diagram

Footnotes

Notes

Citations

References

Further reading

External links
 
 
 

Finite reflection groups
Lie algebras
Lie groups